Ingar Pedersen (1 March 1898 – 10 March 1977) was a Norwegian footballer. He played in six matches for the Norway national football team from 1927 to 1928.

References

External links
 

1898 births
1977 deaths
Norwegian footballers
Norway international footballers
Place of birth missing
Association footballers not categorized by position